Lemuel Floyd Young (August 29, 1907 – January 14, 1962) was a professional baseball player. He played all or part of ten years in Major League Baseball for the Pittsburgh Pirates (1933–40), Cincinnati Reds (1941) and St. Louis Cardinals (1941 and 1945), primarily as a second baseman.

The high point of his career was when he finished 14th in voting for the 1938 National League MVP for playing in 149 games and having 562 at bats, 58 runs, 156 hits, 36 doubles, 5 triples, 4 home runs, 79 RBI, 7 stolen bases, 40 walks, .278 batting average, .329 on-base percentage, .381 slugging percentage, 214 total bases and 5 sacrifice hits.

In 10 seasons he played in 730 games and had 2,466 at bats, 274 runs, 645 hits, 128 doubles, 34 triples, 32 home runs, 347 RBI, 18 stolen bases, 152 walks, .262 batting average, .308 on-base percentage, .380 slugging percentage, 937 total bases and 38 sacrifice hits.

He died in his hometown at the age of 54.

External links

Major League Baseball second basemen
Pittsburgh Pirates players
Cincinnati Reds players
St. Louis Cardinals players
Fayetteville Highlanders players
Greensboro Patriots players
High Point Pointers players
Columbia Comers players
Wichita Aviators players
Tulsa Oilers (baseball) players
Albany Senators players
Rochester Red Wings players
Columbus Red Birds players
Winston-Salem Cardinals players
Baseball players from North Carolina
1907 births
1962 deaths
People from Jamestown, North Carolina